Hapoel Netanya Football Club (Hebrew: מועדון כדורגל הפועל נתניה) was a football club based in Netanya, Israel.

History
The club played their first match at 6 February 1937, in a friendly against Hapoel Kfar Yona, which ended in 1–1 draw.

The club played in the second tier from 1949 to 1955, 1959–1960, 1964–1972 and 1973–1979. The biggest accomplishment of the club came at the end of the 1974–75 season when they finished 4th in the second division. They got relegated at the end of the 1978–79 season. At the end of the 1980–81 season, they got relegated to Liga Bet, the fourth tier of Israeli football.

After major financial problems, the club players were released, and the club dissolved at 15 October 1982.

Honours

League

External links
Hapoel Netanya at National Football Teams

References

Netanya
Association football clubs established in 1937
Association football clubs disestablished in 1982
Sport in Netanya
Netanya
1937 establishments in Mandatory Palestine
1982 disestablishments in Israel